In the first century of the Christian era, the Agapetae (from the Greek word ἀγαπηταί (agapetai), meaning 'beloved') were virgins who consecrated themselves to God with a vow of chastity and associated with laymen. This association later resulted in abuses and scandals, so that councils of the fourth century forbade it. The Council of Ancyra, in 314, forbade virgins consecrated to God to live thus with men as sisters. This did not correct the practice entirely, for St. Jerome arraigns Syrian monks for living in cities with Christian virgins. The Agapetae are sometimes confounded with the subintroductae, or woman who lived with clerics without marriage, a class against which the third canon of the First Council of Nicaea (325) was directed. The practice of clerics living with unrelated women was finally condemned by the First and Second  Lateran Councils.

The Agapetae were also a branch of the Gnostics in the late 4th century, who held that sexual relations were only improper if the mind was impure. They taught that one should perjure himself rather than reveal the secrets of his sect.

See also
 Evangelical counsels

References

 .

Christian terminology
Gnosticism
Jerome
Sexual abstinence and religion